Dhaurahra  Assembly constituency is  one of the 403 constituencies of the Uttar Pradesh Legislative Assembly,  India. It is a part of the Lakhimpur district and one of the five assembly constituencies in the Dhaurahra Lok Sabha constituency. First election in this assembly constituency was held in 1957 after the "DPACO (1956)" (delimitation order) was passed in 1956. After the "Delimitation of Parliamentary and Assembly Constituencies Order" was passed in 2008, the constituency was assigned identification number 141. Vinod Shankar Awasthi of Bharatiya Janata Party is the MLA of Dhaurahra constituency elected in 2022.

Wards / Areas
Extent  of Dhaurahra Assembly constituency is KCs Dhaurahra, Isanagar, Kattouli, PCs  Dulhi, Jatpurwa, Lakhahi, Abhaypur, Devmaniya, Akathi, Kafara, Gurgutta  Buzurg, Muri & Dihuwa Kalan of Ramiya Behar KC of Dhaurahra  Tehsil.

Members of the Legislative Assembly

Election results

2022

2017

2012

See also

Dhaurahra Lok Sabha constituency
Lakhimpur Kheri district
Sixteenth Legislative Assembly of Uttar Pradesh
Uttar Pradesh Legislative Assembly
Uttar Pradesh Legislature (Vidhan Bhawan)

References

External links
 

Assembly constituencies of Uttar Pradesh
Politics of Lakhimpur Kheri district
Constituencies established in 1956